Allan G. Hill is a British-American demographer currently the Andelot Professor at Harvard T.H. Chan School of Public Health and, in 1991, was awarded an honorary doctorate by Harvard.

Education
BA, 1966, University College, Durham, UK
PhD, 1969, Durham University, Durham, UK
Diploma in Demography, 1975, Princeton University
MA Honoris Causa, 1991, Harvard University

References

Harvard School of Public Health faculty
American demographers
British demographers
Princeton University alumni
Year of birth missing (living people)
Living people
Place of birth missing (living people)
Alumni of University College, Durham